Chung Riwoche is a large stupa of unusual design established in 1386 in the traditional Tibetan province of Ü-Tsang.  It was later re-established and built by Mahasiddha Thangtong Gyalpo in 1426. Chung Riwoche is the seat of the Chakzampa (Thangtong Gyalpo) sub-lineage of the Shangpa Kagyu, and is still an active Kumbum with 9 monks as of 2014.

References

Buddhist temples in Tibet
Stupas in China